Nishika de Silva (born 18 July 1990) is a Sri Lankan cricketer who played for the Sri Lanka women's cricket team. She made her Women's Twenty20 International cricket (WT20I) debut for Sri Lanka against India Women on 22 February 2016, and played in a total of three matches for the Sri Lankan team.

References

External links
 

1990 births
Living people
Sri Lankan women cricketers
Sri Lanka women Twenty20 International cricketers
Place of birth missing (living people)